The following is a list of notable events and releases of the year 1988 in Norwegian music.

Events

March
 25 – The 15th Vossajazz started in Voss, Norway (March 25 – 27).

May
 25 – The 16th Nattjazz started in Bergen, Norway (May 25 – June 8).

June
 25 – The 19th Kalvøyafestivalen started at Kalvøya near by Oslo (June 25 – 26).
 26 – Leonard Cohen performed a concert at Kalvøya, Bærum (Kalvøyafestivalen).

Albums released

Unknown date

G
 Jan Garbarek
 Legend Of The Seven Dreams (ECM Records)

S
 Thorgeir Stubø
 The End Of A Tune (Cadence Jazz Records), with Art Farmer and Doug Raney

Deaths

 January
 9 – Peter L. Rypdal, fiddler and famous traditional folk music composer (born 1909).

 July
 1 – Robert Riefling, classical pianist and music teacher (born 1911).

Births

 February
 5 – Fredrik Luhr Dietrichson, jazz upright bassist.
 15 – Ragnhild Hemsing, classical and traditional folk violinist.
 26 – Christian Meaas Svendsen, jazz upright bassist and composer.

 April
 12 – Tone Damli Aaberge, singer.

 May
 7 – David Aleksander Sjølie, jazz guitarist, Mopti.
 9 – Fredrik Rasten, guitarist, improviser, and composer.

 July
 31 – Andreas Wildhagen, jazz drummer.

 August
 12 – Chriss Rune Olsen Angvik, rhythm & blues guitarist and vocalist.
 17 - Natalie Sandtorv, jazz singer, percussionist, and electronica artist.

 Unknown date
 Jan Martin Gismervik, jazz drummer.

See also
 1988 in Norway
 Music of Norway
 Norway in the Eurovision Song Contest 1988

References

 
Norwegian music
Norwegian
Music
1980s in Norwegian music